"What You Are" is a song by American singer Lionel Richie. It was written by Jermaine Dupri, Manuel Seal and Johntá Austin for Richie's eighth studio album Coming Home (2006), while production was helmed by Dupri and Seal. The song was released as the album's second single and reached number 15 on the US Billboard Adult R&B Songs.

Track listing

Charts

References

2006 singles
Lionel Richie songs
Song recordings produced by Jermaine Dupri
Songs written by Jermaine Dupri
Songs written by Manuel Seal
2006 songs